The Moe Show is a New Zealand live-action preschool puppet series. It follows puppet character Moe on his journeys of discovery throughout New Zealand.

Characters
Moe is based on the New Zealand legend of the Moehau Monster, and is performed by Jeremy Dillon.

Fern the Forest Fairy is performed by Sarah Thomson.

Gilbert the Gecko and Frank the Fantail are both performed by Simon McKinney.

The voice of the Narrator is provided by former What Now presenter Jason Fa'afoi.

References

External links

2013 New Zealand television series debuts
English-language television shows
Four (New Zealand TV channel) original programming
New Zealand children's television series
New Zealand television shows featuring puppetry
Television shows funded by NZ on Air
Three (TV channel) original programming